Thea Loise Señerez Tolentino (born August 13, 1996) is a Filipino actress known for her role as Ashley Mercado Alcantara in the GMA Network television drama The Half Sisters. She started her career as one of the winners of the second season of Protégé, a talent-search reality show created by GMA Network. Since then, she became a contract artist of GMA and began appearing on various dramas such as Anna Karenina, Pyra: Ang Babaeng Apoy, Hahamakin ang Lahat and Asawa Ko, Karibal Ko. She also gained public attention for playing the villain sorcereress in Haplos (2017), which is her most villainous role up to date. Recently, she portrayed an evil mother in Madrasta (2019).

Early life
Tolentino was born and raised in Calamba, Laguna, Philippines. Prior to joining Protégé, she stated that "she had never been separated from the family." Crazy Little Thing Called Love and Lie To Me are one of her favorite films and TV series respectively. She's a self-proclaimed Jpop fan, most especially by the Johnny's idol group Hey! Say! JUMP. She had said in interviews before that she went back to Japan just to watch their concert and to see her crush Ryosuke Yamada.

Tolentino graduated from the Trinity University of Asia, where she took up Business Administration major in Public Administration.

Career

2012: Protégé
Tolentino auditioned in front of Gina Alajar who turned out as her mentor in the entire run of the show. She sang "Torete" by Moonstar88 while playing a guitar. Eventually, Tolentino and Mark Kenneth Banez was chosen as one of the official protégés for that season and one of the four protégés of Gina Alajar.

Tolentino said that she joined Protégé to hone her skills, to let the people know that she has a talent and to help her family.

Mentor Gina helped her all throughout the show and Tolentino's shyness was gradually fading as the competition became tougher. The improvements in her performances during gala night was seen by the judges.

Singing is considered as Tolentino's niche. Mikoy Morales, one of Jolina Magdangal's protégés, worked with Tolentino by composing a song entitled "Butterfly". Morales and Tolentino sang the song and Mark Escueta, husband of Jolina Magdangal and one of the members of Rivermaya, helped in creating the music video of "Butterfly".

At the end of the competition, Tolentino was announced as the "Ultimate Female Protégé" by the host, Dingdong Dantes. Tolentino's male counterpart in winning the competition is Jeric Gonzales, who is also from Calamba.

2012–2015: Post-Protégé
Weeks after winning the reality search, Tolentino, along with co-winner Jeric Gonzales, were cast in the TGIS' sequel Teen Gen. However, the series ended its run and Tolentino moved on to take part as the scheming "Angel" in the 2013 resurrection of the series Anna Karenina. In mid-2013, GMA Network announced that they have chosen her to play the lead in the new daytime drama Pyra: Ang Babaeng Apoy. In 2014 Tolentino landed the lead character of Ashley as one of the main characters in The Half Sisters, with Barbie Forteza and Andre Paras. This show garnered more extensions and positive ratings, even Tolentino's acting role as Ashley also gained praises as well.

2016: Drama Roles
She played as a villain in the drama Once Again, led by Aljur Abrenica and Janine Gutierrez. She also starred in various Maynila episodes. Finding her niche in portraying villain roles, Thea played the role of a Pheobe Ke in Hahamakin ang Lahat that ran from  the last quarter of the year till the start of 2017.

2017—present
Right after Hahamakin ang Lahat, she was cast in the primetime drama Destined to be Yours, which was the first TV drama of the Phenomenal Love Team AlDub. She then starred in Haplos where she plays a vengeful witch Lucille, opposite the  “Healer” character Angela played by Sanya Lopez. Tolentino also played in the movie This Time I'll Be Sweeter with Barbie Forteza and Ken Chan, and also had appearances in the sitcom Inday Will Always Love You along with Forteza, one of the show's protagonist. One of her latest roles was a transgender antagonist named Venus Hermosa, who was played by Jason Abalos during his role as Nathan Bravante/Catriona in the afternoon series Asawa Ko, Karibal Ko. She has also appeared in numerous GMA television anthologies such as Maynila, Magpakailanman and Dear Uge, among others, due to her impressive versatility in portraying various roles and characters. Her new project was in another villain role, where she portrayed a psycho murderer and cunning mother in Madrasta.

Filmography

Television

Film

Awards and nominations

References

External links
 
 Sparkle profile

1996 births
Living people
People from Calamba, Laguna
Tagalog people
Actresses from Laguna (province)
Filipino child actresses
Filipino television actresses
Participants in Philippine reality television series
Reality show winners
Protégé (TV series) participants
GMA Network personalities